The 2000–01 NLA season was the 63rd regular season of the Nationalliga A, the main professional ice hockey league in Switzerland.

Regular season

Final standings

Playoffs

Quarterfinals

Semifinals

Finals

References
sehv.ch
hockeystats.ch

External links
hockeyfans.ch
eishockeyforum.ch
spoor.ch

1
Swiss